Dioscoride Lanza (born 24 April 1898) was an Italian racing driver. He entered 30 races between 1936 and 1955 – of which he started 24 – most of them in a Maserati. His best result was a fourth place at the Coppa Ciano Junior.

Complete results

References

1898 births
Year of death missing
Italian racing drivers
Mille Miglia drivers